Devunipalli is a small village under the Andugulapalli Gram Panchayat in Peddapalli district in Telangana state. It is located 2 km away from Andugulapalli and 6 km from Peddapalli. Lakshmi Narasimha Temple, Devunipalli is a famous temple in the village. Every year on the Karthika Purnima day (full moon in the month of Karthik), a Kalyanotsavam (Wedding Festival) is celebrated for the deity, followed by a five-day celebration ending in a Rathotsavam (Chariot Festival). During the five-day celebrations, the village hosts pilgrims from the surrounding villages and towns.

Gallery

Villages in Peddapalli district